Ohnesorge is a German-language surname whose literal meaning is "without worry", i.e., "carefree." Ohnesorge may refer to:

 Ohnesorge number, a dimensionless quantity in fluid dynamics
 Wilhelm Ohnesorge, member of Nazi cabinet
 Cory Ohnesorge, American football punter
 Lena Ohnesorge, German politician

See also 
 Benno Ohnesorg